Freedom Writers is a  2007 American drama film written and directed by Richard LaGravenese and starring Hilary Swank, Scott Glenn, Imelda Staunton, Patrick Dempsey and Mario.

It is based on the 1999 book The Freedom Writers Diary by teacher Erin Gruwell and students who compiled the book out of real diary entries about their lives that they wrote in their English class at Woodrow Wilson Classical High School in Long Beach, California. The movie is also based on the DC program called City at Peace.  The title of the movie and book is a play on the term "Freedom Riders", referring to the multiracial civil rights activists who tested the U.S. Supreme Court decision ordering the desegregation of interstate buses in 1961.

The idea for the film came from journalist Tracey Durning, who made a documentary about Erin Gruwell for the ABC News program Primetime Live. Durning served as co-executive producer of the film. The film was dedicated to the memory of Armand Jones, who was killed after filming Freedom Writers. He was fatally shot at age 18 in Anaheim, California, after a confrontation with a man who robbed Jones of a necklace in a Denny's restaurant.

Plot

In 1994 in Long Beach, California, Erin Gruwell has been accepted to teach English for at-risk students at Woodrow Wilson High School—a once highly acclaimed school that has declined since voluntary integration had been enforced and where racial tension has increased since the Los Angeles riots two years before. Erin struggles to form a connection with her students and observes numerous fights between some of them, who are in rival gangs.

One night, Latin American student Eva Benitez goes into a convenience store while her boyfriend Paco, who is a fellow gang member, and two other friends stay in the car. Eva's classmate and rival Sindy Ngor, who is a Cambodian refugee, her boyfriend, and another friend also enter the store. African American student Grant Rice, frustrated about losing an arcade game, demands a refund from the store owner. As Grant storms out, Paco, as retaliation for losing a fight against him earlier during a massive brawl at school, attempts to kill him, but misses and accidentally kills Sindy's boyfriend while Grant flees the scene and is later arrested for the homicide. As a witness, Eva must testify in court; she intends to guard "her own" in her testimony.

The next day at school, Erin examines a racist drawing by one of her Latin American students and utilizes it to teach the class about the Holocaust, which everyone, except for White student Ben Samuels, has no knowledge of. She gradually begins to earn their trust and buys composition books for them to use as diaries, in which they write about their experiences of being evicted, being abused, and seeing their loved ones die.

Determined to reform her students, Erin takes on two part-time jobs to pay for more books and activities, and spends a lot more time at school, much to the disappointment of her husband, Scott. A transformation is specifically visible in one student, Marcus. Erin invites several Jewish Holocaust survivors to talk with her class about their experiences and requires the students to attend a field trip to the Museum of Tolerance. The students start to realize that being rivals against each other, just based on color, should not be a reason to prohibit their friendships with one another. Meanwhile, her unique training methods are scorned by her colleagues and department chair Margaret Campbell.

The following school year comes and Erin teaches her class (now sophomores) again, making it the second year that she is their teacher. On the first day, Erin makes her class propose a "Toast for Change", allowing everyone to open up about their struggles and what they wish to change about themselves. Later on, the class makes enough money to have Miep Gies come to the United States and tell her story of her helping Anne Frank, her family, and the Van Pels hide from the Nazis; she then also persuades the students that they are heroes and that they "within their own small ways, [can] turn on a small light in a dark room."

These two events inspire Eva to tell the truth, breaking free of the demands of her father to always protect her own. At Grant's trial, she shocks the courtroom by revealing that Paco actually killed Sindy's boyfriend at the scene; Grant is spared while Paco is convicted, Sindy later forgives Eva. Afterward, Eva is attacked and threatened by her gang members, but is ultimately spared because of her father as she moves in with her aunt for safety.

Meanwhile, Erin asks her students to write their diaries in book form. She compiles the entries and names it The Freedom Writers Diary. Her husband divorces her, since he feels like Erin is devoting too much of her time to her students and not enough time for their marriage. Margaret tells her she cannot teach her kids for their junior year. After being encouraged by her father, a former civil rights activist, Erin fights this decision, eventually convincing the superintendent to permit her to teach her kids during their junior and senior years, much to their elation. The film ends with a note that Erin successfully prepared numerous high school students to graduate and attend college—for many, the first in their families to do so.

Cast

 Hilary Swank as Erin Gruwell
 Patrick Dempsey as Scott Casey
 Scott Glenn as Steve Gruwell, Erin's Father
 Imelda Staunton as Margaret Campbell
 John Benjamin Hickey as Brian Gilford
 April Lee Hernández as Eva Benitez
 Mario as Andre Bryant
 Jason Finn as Marcus
 Vanetta Smith as Brandy Ross
 Antonio Garcia as Miguel
 Jaclyn Ngan as Sindy Nger
 Armand Jones as Grant Ricecake
 Kristin Herrera as Gloria Munez
 Gabriel Chavarria as Tito
 Hunter Parrish as Ben Samuels
 Giovonnie Samuels as Victoria
 Deance Wyatt as Jamal Hill
 Sergio Montalvo as Alejandro Santiago
 Robert Wisdom as Dr. Tristan Jhon Mamangon
 Will Morales as Paco
 Ricardo Molina as Eva's Father
 Angela Alvarado as Eva's Mother
 Pat Carroll as Miep Gies
 Lisa Banes as Karin Polachek

Release
Freedom Writers had a domestic gross of $36,605,602 and had a foreign gross of $6,485,139 bringing the movie to a total gross of $43,090,741 worldwide. On the film's opening weekend it grossed a total of $9,405,582 ranking 4th behind Children of Men (3rd), The Pursuit of Happyness (2nd), and Night at the Museum (1st).

Reception
Freedom Writers has received mostly positive reviews from critics. The review aggregator website Rotten Tomatoes provides links to 126 reviews, 70% of which are positive. The critical consensus is that "Freedom Writers is a frank, formulaic entry in the inspirational inner-city teacher genre, with an energetic Hilary Swank leading the appealing cast of unknowns."  Another review aggregator, Metacritic, which assigns a weighted average score out of 100 to reviews from mainstream critics, calculated an average score of 64/100 based on 29 reviews, indicating "generally favorable reviews".

Cynthia Fuchs of Common Sense Media gave the film three out of five stars, writing in her review that "the plot is predictable, the actors too old to play high school students, and the pacing too slow. And really, the camera circles around deep-thinking faces a few too many times. But Freedom Writers also argues for listening to teenagers. That in itself makes it a rare and close-to-wonderful thing." The film received a positive rating from Fox Weekly, giving the film a 9 out of 10.

Criticisms

Mrs. Gruwell as the savior 
Freedom Writers is set in California during the 1990s, which is still feeling the effects of the 1992 Los Angeles riots two years after the time period of the movie. The scene is set by the opening news montage chronicling the riots, and the narration from Eva explaining the racial dynamics that still pervade her city and her school. From the beginning, the perception of race is demonstrated by the students’ reception of Gruwell and their attitudes towards each other, but as they come to trust her, their attitudes and behaviors change. Despite the tagline of the movie being, “Their story. Their words. Their future,” Hilary Swank was the central character and image of all promotions. Swank's face on the poster, which is much larger and in-focus than the students on the poster, demonstrates how even if the words and stories of the students are central to the plot, the educator is being given credit for the overall success of their students, instead of on the students themselves.

Effect on education 
Since its release, Freedom Writers has become a topic of conversation in the reshaping of teaching styles, especially in classrooms with at-risk children.  Following the success of The Freedom Writers Diary, Erin Gruwell founded the Freedom Writers Foundation.  The non-profit encourages a more diverse and inclusive classroom experience with the specific goal of providing further educational opportunities for minority and at-risk students.  Gruwell, the original Freedom Writers featured in the book (many of whom are now educators), and other educators have crafted training programs for educators to help their students succeed and pursue higher education.

Gruwell also developed a curriculum of books for educators to serve as resources to implement the Freedom Writers Method of teaching in more classrooms.  The books in the series include The Freedom Writers Diary, Teaching Hope (written by Gruwell and other Freedom Writers teachers), Teach With Your Heart (Gruwell's personal memoir), and The Freedom Writers Diary Teacher’s Guide (a classroom resource for teachers looking to implement the Freedom Writers Method in their classrooms).

Soundtrack

Common lent his talents to the soundtrack with "A Dream", featuring and produced by The Black Eyed Peas member will.i.am. The soundtrack also includes the Tupac Shakur song "Keep Ya Head Up".

Instrumental sections of Sia's "Breathe Me" accompany the film's television trailer.

The Freedom Writers soundtrack contains the following songs:
 "A Dream" by Common featuring will.i.am
 "Listen!!!" by Talib Kweli
 "It’s R Time" by Jeannie Ortega
 "When the Ship Goes Down" by Cypress Hill
 "Hip Hop Hooray" by Naughty by Nature
 "Keep Ya Head Up" by 2Pac
 "Code of the Streets" by Gang Starr
 "Rebirth of Slick (Cool Like Dat)" by Digable Planets
 "Officer" by Pharcyde
 "This Is How We Do It" by Montell Jordan
 "Colours" by will.i.am
 "Bus Ride" by will.i.am
 "Riots" by will.i.am
 "Eva’s Theme" by Mark Isham
 "Anne Frank" by Mark Isham

See also

 List of hood films

References

External links
 
 
 
 
 
 
 
 Freedom Writers Production Notes
 eFilmCritic.com interview with educator Erin Gruwell and real-life Freedom Writer Maria Reyes on "Freedom Writers"
 'Cinematical' interview with Erin Gruwell, Jason Finn, and Maria Reyes

2007 films
2007 biographical drama films
Biographical films about educators
Cultural depictions of American women
Cultural depictions of educators
Films about race and ethnicity
Drama films based on actual events
Films based on non-fiction books
Films directed by Richard LaGravenese
Films set in 1994
MTV Films films
Paramount Pictures films
Films set in schools
Films set in Los Angeles
Hood films
Films shot in California
Films about activists
Films about teacher–student relationships
Films scored by Mark Isham
Films produced by Danny DeVito
2007 drama films
2000s English-language films
2000s American films